Isaac Seumalo (born October 29, 1993) is an American football guard for the Pittsburgh Steelers of the National Football League (NFL). He played college football at Oregon State.

High school career
A native of Corvallis, Oregon, Seumalo attended Corvallis High School, where he was an 5A First-team All-State as an offensive and defensive lineman as a junior and senior. He had transferred there from Santiam Christian School, where he played his freshman and sophomore years. Regarded as a four-star recruit by Rivals.com, Seumalo was listed as the No. 3 offensive guard prospect in his class. He chose Oregon State, where his father Joe Seumalo worked as defensive line coach, over offers from Oregon, Stanford, and Southern California. Seumalo had been working out in the summer on Oregon State's campus.

College career
In his first season at Oregon State, Seumalo became the first true freshman to start at center since Roger Levasa in 1978, appeared in all 13 games and earned Freshman All-American honors by College Football News and CBSSports.com, as well as honorable mention All-Pac-12 honors. Seumalo was particularly praised for his performance against reigning Pac-12 Defensive Lineman of the Year Star Lotulelei, in a victory over the Utah Utes.

Professional career

Philadelphia Eagles 
On April 29, 2016, the Philadelphia Eagles selected Seumalo in the third round (79th overall) of the 2016 NFL Draft. In 2017, Seumalo played in 14 games, however, he was benched as the starting left guard in favor of Stefan Wisniewski after a poor performance in a week 2 loss to the Kansas City Chiefs. He won his first Super Bowl ring when the Eagles defeated the New England Patriots 41-33 in Super Bowl LII.

In 2018, Seumalo entered the season as the backup left guard behind Stefen Wisniewski. He was named the starter in Week 5 and started the next nine games before being sidelined the final three weeks of the regular season with a pectoral injury.

On March 4, 2019, Seumalo signed a three-year contract extension with the Eagles through the 2022 season.

On September 22, 2020, Seumalo was placed on injured reserve with a knee injury. He was activated on November 20, 2020.

On September 28, 2021, Seumalo was placed on injured reserve after suffering a Lisfranc injury in Week 3.

On December 21, 2022, Seumalo was named an NFC Pro Bowl alternate. Seumalo helped the Eagles reach Super Bowl LVII but lost 38-35 to the Kansas City Chiefs.

Pittsburgh Steelers 
On March 18, 2023, Seumalo signed a three-year deal with the Pittsburgh Steelers.

Personal life 
Seumalo's father Joe is currently the defensive line coach at San Jose State, while his sister Jessi is currently the director of on-campus recruiting for the Washington State football team.

References

External links
Philadelphia Eagles bio
Oregon State Beavers bio

1993 births
Living people
American people of Samoan descent
American football offensive linemen
Corvallis High School (Oregon) alumni
Oregon State Beavers football players
Philadelphia Eagles players
Players of American football from Hawaii
Players of American football from Oregon
Sportspeople from Corvallis, Oregon